Serpentarium Wildlife Park  is a small reptile park  located in  St Helens, Tasmania, Australia. The park was established by Matthew Lowndes as a facility to further the general publics education of reptiles through viewing and offering some hands on encounters for visitors with some of the reptiles. The park includes a nursery for incubating and raising captive bred reptiles, a reptile husbandry library, a reptile research station with microscopes and a collection of minerals and cultural artefacts, and a café.

The snake species at the park all belong to the python family and include banded rock python, black-headed python, boa constrictor, carpet pythons (diamond, jungle and northwestern), central carpet python,  green anaconda,  reticulated python, scrub python,  spotted python and tiger python. Other reptiles kept at the park are blotched blue-tongued lizard,  eastern bearded dragon,  freshwater crocodile,  lace monitor,  mountain dragon, perentie and star tortoises.  Rio a blue-and-gold macaw, eastern grey kangaroos and red-neck wallabies are also residents of the park.

References

External links
 

2003 establishments in Australia
Parks in Tasmania
Wildlife parks in Australia